The Pesekanaskoskau River is a river in northern Cochrane District in Northeastern Ontario, Canada. It is part of the James Bay drainage basin, and is a left tributary of the Bodell River.

The river begins in unnamed muskeg and flows east to its mouth at the Bodell River. The Bodell River flows via the Kesagami River and the Harricana River to James Bay.

See also
List of rivers of Ontario

References

Sources

Rivers of Cochrane District